The Levington Research Station is a fertiliser research institute in Suffolk.

History

Fisons
It was opened by Fisons in 1957. It received a Civic Trust Award in 1959. Fisons sold the property in 1981.

Around three hundred people worked at the site and it was one of Europe's largest research institutes in the field of fertiliser.

Ownership
On 1 January 1960, Fisons Horticulture and Fisons Fertilisers were formed. The research site worked with both.

The horticultural division of Fisons was sold off for £25.4m in a management buy out in 1994 known as Levington Horticulture; the division had around 280 people and around 26% of the UK market, turning over £47m.  In 1997 this division was sold on again to the present ownership.

Fertiliser
The research site developed the first specialist sports turf fertiliser; typical agricultural fertiliser was too concentrated: this is now found at all main golf courses across Europe under the Greensmaster brand. Levington Horticulture also made Turfclear herbicide, and had a Royal Warrant.

Compost
The site is known for developing Levington Compost in the 1960s. The compost was made in South Yorkshire and the fertiliser was made at Bramford, west of Ipswich, next to the Great Eastern Main Line.

Levington Multi-Purpose Compost (when owned by Fisons) had a 1984 television advert featuring Jack and the Beanstalk.

Visits
On Tuesday 1 May 1956, the site was visited by the Duke of Edinburgh.

Structure
It is in the Suffolk Coastal district of Suffolk.

See also
 History of fertilizer
 Sports Turf Research Institute

References

External links
 History

1957 establishments in England
Chemical industry in the United Kingdom
Chemical research institutes
Horticultural organisations based in the United Kingdom
Research institutes established in 1957
Research institutes in Suffolk
East Suffolk (district)